Michał Mitko (born 12 December 1988 in Rybnik, Poland) is a Polish  speedway rider who is a member of Poland U-21 team. He is current Team U-21 World Champion.

Honours

World Championships 
 Individual U-21 World Championship
 2008 - 10th place in Qualifying Round 3
 2009 -  Goričan - 14th place (3 pts)
 Team U-21 World Championship
 2008 -  Holsted - World Champion (7 points)

European Championships 
 Individual U-19 European Championship
 2007 - 8th place in Semi-Final 3

Domestic competitions 
 Individual Polish Championship
 2008 - 15th place in Quarter-Final
 2009 - 11th place in Quarter-Final 2
 Individual U-21 Polish Championship
 2008 -  Rybnik - 11th place (6 pts)
 2009 -  Leszno - 11th place (6 pts)
 Team U-21 Polish Championship
 2008 -  Leszno - 2nd place (10 pts)
 Polish Silver Helmet (U-21)
 2008 -  Rzeszów - 6th place (10 pts)
 2009 -  Częstochowa - 12th place (4 pts)

See also 
 Poland national speedway team
 Speedway in Poland

References

External links 
 (Polish) Official webside

1988 births
Living people
Polish speedway riders
Team Speedway Junior World Champions
People from Rybnik
Sportspeople from Silesian Voivodeship